Patchway Community School is a mixed secondary school and sixth form located in Almondsbury in the English county of Gloucestershire.

Previously a community school administered by South Gloucestershire Council, Patchway Community School converted to academy status on 1 November 2013. However the school continues to coordinate with South Gloucestershire Council for admissions.

Patchway Community School offers GCSEs and BTECs as programmes of study for pupils, while students in the sixth form have the option to study from a range of A-levels and further BTECs.

References

External links
Patchway Community School official website

Secondary schools in South Gloucestershire District
Academies in South Gloucestershire District